Agaricus annae is a species of mushroom in the genus Agaricus. This species is in the family Agaricaceae.

References

annae
Fungi described in 1951